Kagan may refer to:

 Kagan (surname), including a list of people with the name 
 Kagan, Uzbekistan, a town
 Kaghan Valley in Pakistan

See also 
 Cagn or Kaggen, supreme god of the San people (Bushmen) of Southern Africa
 Khagan or Qaghan, a title for a ruler in Turkic and Mongolian languages
 Kağan (disambiguation)
 Kaghan (disambiguation)
 Kogen (disambiguation)